Evgenia Trushnikova (born 23 February 1985) is a Paralympian athlete from Russia competing mainly in category T37 sprint events.

Sporting career
Trushnikova competed in the 100m, 200m and 400m in Athens at the 2004 Summer Paralympics winning gold in the 200m. In 2008 she competed in the 100m and 200m without any medal success. At the 2012 Summer Paralympics in London, Trushnikova was back on the podium, taking bronze in her new specialized distance, the 400 metre race.

Outside of the Paralympics, Trushnikova has found success at both the World and European Athletic Championships. In 2014, she won the 400m title at the European Championships in Swansea and the following year she won the 400 m World title at Doha.

References

External links 
 

1985 births
Living people
Sportspeople from Saratov
Russian female sprinters
Paralympic athletes of Russia
Paralympic bronze medalists for Russia
Paralympic gold medalists for Russia
Athletes (track and field) at the 2004 Summer Paralympics
Athletes (track and field) at the 2008 Summer Paralympics
Medalists at the 2004 Summer Paralympics
Medalists at the 2012 Summer Paralympics
Paralympic medalists in athletics (track and field)
21st-century Russian women